Rebekah D. Fenton (born 1990) is an American pediatrician and adolescent health advocate. Fenton is an Adolescent Medicine Fellow in The Potocsnak Family Division of Adolescent and Young Adult Medicine at Lurie Children's Hospital at the Feinberg School of Medicine at Northwestern University in Chicago, Illinois. Fenton's clinical work is centered around providing healthcare for marginalized youth populations with a focus on cultural humility and health equity. After the police murder of George Floyd, Fenton provided medical care to protestors and has created virtual grieving spaces for Black and brown people in her medical community. As an avid writer, Fenton uses writing as a platform for advocacy to communicate topics such as public health, adolescent medicine, and diversity in medicine.

Early life and education 
Fenton grew up in Sacramento, California with her sister Elisabeth Lucien, her brother Michael Lucien, and her mother and father. Fenton's parents both worked in healthcare, so from a young age, she was aware of her desire to work in healthcare and help others. Fenton attended St. Francis High School, an all-women's high school, in Sacramento, California. In high school, Fenton's sister was diagnosed with Hodgkin Lymphoma. The experience of seeing her sister face a life-threatening disease as an adolescent inspired Fenton's future work with adolescents.

In 2008, Fenton pursued her undergraduate degree at Stanford University. She majored in Human Biology and concentrated in Development from Girl to Women, a concentration she created. In 2010, Fenton joined forces with her friend, Michael Tubbs, to create a program at Stanford to help underrepresented high school students apply to college and become the first in their families to post secondary education. The non-profit they founded was called The Phoenix Scholars. Fenton became the Director of Mentor Development for the program for three years and also mentored three students directly. The program continues to exist at Stanford University, led by Stanford students, with a 100% success rate of college admission and matriculation among the students in the program. In addition to her non-profit, Fenton volunteered with the Stanford Hospital's Teen Health Van to provide healthcare services to uninsured teens.

After graduating from Stanford in 2012, Fenton moved to the East Coast to attend medical school at the Perelman School of Medicine at the University of Pennsylvania. In medical school, Fenton discovered that she wanted to practice adolescent medicine where she could listen to patients’ stories and diagnose them in a holistic way that did not focus on just one organ system.  During medical school, Fenton also found out about the return of her sister's cancer. Fenton became a bone marrow donor for her sister, which led to the successful treatment of her sister's cancer.

Following her medical degree in 2016, Fenton moved back to the West Coast to pursue her residency training in Pediatrics at the Seattle Children's Hospital at the University of Washington in Seattle, Washington.

Career and advocacy 
In 2019, Fenton became an Adolescent Medicine Fellow in the Potocsnak Family Division of Adolescent and Young Adult Medicine at the Ann and Robert H. Lurie Children's Hospital of Chicago at the Feinberg School of Medicine at Northwestern University in Chicago, Illinois. Fenton specializes in Adolescent Medicine with a focus on treating and educating marginalized youth populations such as homeless and gender-nonconforming youth. She has conducted research on the use of hospital sponsored blogs as a platform for transgender teens and their families to seek anonymous medical advice and expertise. Fenton also continues to advocate for supporting minorities in medicine. She organizes group mentoring sessions for medical students from racially underrepresented backgrounds to help them prepare their applications for pediatric residency programs. She uses her own story as an example of the lack of confidence and support given to minority students, and then she created a supportive mentorship community to make sure that every student has a chance to excel and continue their careers in medicine.

Writing and advocacy 
Fenton is an avid writer and has written for Medium since 2018 about topics in medicine, public health, and advocacy. As an advocate for health equity with a focus on providing care for marginalized youth, Fenton uses writing as a platform to educate and raise awareness of these topics.

During the COVID-19 pandemic, Fenton explored the racial disparities in health outcomes across patients in America. In her article, she highlighted that Black patients are often denied testing due to a lack of travel history, they are more at risk of dying due to existing chronic health conditions, and Black people make up the majority of deaths due to COVID in many states though they only make up less than 14% of the population. She advocates for improved tracking of race and ethnicity data to better understand and dissect the inequities that exist in healthcare, especially in times of crisis.

In 2018, Fenton communicated the critical need to address gun violence as a public health threat. Since Fenton provided healthcare to underserved and marginalized adolescents, this gun violence disproportionately affects her patient population. Fenton walked with her students during the #MarchForOurLives in 2018.  After the murder of George Floyd in 2020, Fenton wrote about her experience providing care for Black Lives Matter protesters. Fenton also worked with her colleagues to create a grieving space for Black and brown healthcare workers and students. In addition to organizing and participating in marches alongside fellow physicians, Fenton advocates for the need for physicians and healthcare workers to acknowledge racism in their day-to-day work in order to provide the best care for their patients.

Awards and honors 

 2019 James Owens Sr., MD Award for Excellence in Adolescent Health and Medicine
 2016 Selected Student Speaker for her Medical School Graduating Class at Perelman School of Medicine

Select media and writing 

 2020 Medium “Physicians for #PoliceFreeSchools”
 2020 Bustle.com “Talking About Racism Must Be A Part Of Health Care, According To A Doctor” 
 2020 Forbes “‘I Am Tired’: What Black Doctors Need You To Know Right Now”
 2020 Medpage Today “Can't We Do Better to Support Minorities in Medicine? — At every step, too many of us fall by the wayside”
 2020 Medium “I'm Concerned About “US”: A Black Doctor's Plea for Racial COVID-19 Data”
 2018 UW Medicine Newsroom “As med school swells vocabulary, plain English can wither”
 2018 Kevin MD.com “Medical education systematically ignores the diversity of medical practice”
 2016 The Philadelphia Inquirer “Despite doubts and hurdles, why medicine is a calling for Penn Med student”
 2016 Penn Medicine News “Match Day 2016: A Tale of Two Coasts”
 2015 The Grown Up Truth “Diary of A Young Pro: Rebekah Lucien”

Publications 

 Fenton, R. (2019). When Doctors Unlearn English. Journal of Palliative Care, 34(1), 16–17. https://doi.org/10.1177/0825859718795438
 Rebekah Fenton, Sara Handschin, Yolanda Evans. 81 - “What Options Do I Have?”: Qualitative Analysis of Comments by Transgender Youth and Their Families on Adolescent Health Blog. Journal of Adolescent Health. Volume 62, Issue 2, Supplement, 2018, Pages S44-S45, ISSN 1054-139X, https://doi.org/10.1016/j.jadohealth.2017.11.088.

References 

Living people
Date of birth missing (living people)
Place of birth missing (living people)
American pediatricians
Women pediatricians
Stanford University alumni
Perelman School of Medicine at the University of Pennsylvania alumni
1990 births